Saints Chrysanthus and Daria (3rd century – 283.AD) are saints of the Early Christian period. Their names appear in the Martyrologium Hieronymianum, an early martyrs list, and a church in their honour was built over their reputed grave in Rome.

Legend
The Acts of the Martyrs relating the legend of Chrysanthus and Daria exist in Greek and Latin versions, dating from the fifth century and all "without historical value", according to Johann Peter Kirsch, writing in the Catholic Encyclopedia. 

According to legend, Chrysanthus was the only son of an Egyptian patrician, named Polemius or Poleon, who lived in the reign of Numerian. His father moved from Alexandria to Rome, and Chrysanthus was educated in the finest manner of the era. Disenchanted with the excess in the Roman world, he began reading the Acts of the Apostles. 

He was then baptized and educated in the Christian faith by a priest named Carpophorus. His father was unhappy with Chrysanthus's conversion, and attempted to inculcate secular ways into his son by arranging a marriage to Daria, a Roman priestess of Minerva, or as other accounts state, a Vestal Virgin. Chrysanthus managed to convert his wife, and the couple agreed to lead celibate lives. They went on to convert a number of Romans. 

When this was made known to Claudius, the tribune, Chrysanthus was arrested and tortured. Chrysanthus's faith and fortitude under torture were so impressive to Claudius that he and his wife, Hilaria, two sons named Maurus and Jason, and seventy of his soldiers became Christians. For this betrayal, the Emperor had Claudius drowned, his sons beheaded, and his wife hanged at the gallows. The legend states that Daria was forced to live as a prostitute, as virgins could not be executed, but her chastity was defended by a lioness. She was brought before Numerian and he ordered her death. There are many variations to the means, from execution by stoning, while others say she was beheaded, and yet others claim she was buried alive in a deep pit beside her husband. It appears the last torment was chosen for Daria, as it was the execution method reserved for unchaste Vestal Virgins. They were entombed in a sand pit near the Via Salaria Nova, the catacombs in Rome.

The surviving "Acts" of Chrysanthus and Daria state that on the anniversary of their deaths, a large number of Christians had gathered at their underground crypt to pay their respects when Roman persecutors surprised them, filled the crypt with stones and buried them all alive, including Diodorus, a priest, and Marianus, a deacon.

Historicity 
In 2011 a scientific investigation of the bodies, conducted by a group of scholars coordinated by Ezio Fulcheri, paleopathologist at the University of Genoa, highlighted the compatibility of the finds with the story handed down by tradition. 

Radiocarbon dating reveals that the remains of the two young people, a male between the age of 17 and 18 and a female between 20 and 25, date back to an era of between 80 and 340 AD. A high concentration of lead was found in the bones, a sign of their wealthy background as only the rich had running water in the houses, conducted through lead pipes. None of the bodies showed signs of violence or illness, so the cause of death could be compatible with suffocation.

Relics
At least three places claim to possess the remains of Chrysanthus and Daria. In the ninth century, their reputed remains  were brought to Prüm in modern-day Rhineland-Palatinate, and these relics are presently in the church of Chrysanthus and Daria, Bad Münstereifel, Germany.  In 1011, Pope Sergius IV gave Fulk III, Count of Anjou, the reputed bodies of Chrysanthus and Daria upon his return from a pilgrimage to Jerusalem. Fulk gave them to the monastery of Belli Locus (now Beaulieu-lès-Loches), which he had recently established. The cathedral of Reggio Emilia in northern Italy also contains relics reputed to be those of Daria and Chrysanthus. A scientific study of some of the bones there confirmed that they were those of a young man and a young woman in their late teens, with a radiocarbon date between 80 and 340.

References

Further reading

External links

Patron Saints Index: Sts. Chrysanthus and Daria
Holy Protection Russian Orthodox Church
Holy Martyrs Chrysanthus and Daria in Orthodoxy
Selected Lives of Saints
. A drama of early Christian Rome by Pedro Calderón de la Barca, translated by Denis Florence MacCarthy.

3rd-century births
283 deaths
Daria
3rd-century Christian saints
3rd-century Romans
Daria
Saints from Roman Egypt
Groups of Christian martyrs of the Roman era
Married couples
Saints duos
3rd-century Christian martyrs
Daria